WLPC may refer to:

 WLPC-CD, a low-power television station (channel 28) licensed to serve Redford, Michigan, United States
 Warped Linear Predictive Coding, a signal processing method